This Man Is Mine is a 1946 British comedy film directed by Marcel Varnel and starring Tom Walls, Glynis Johns and Jeanne De Casalis. The screenplay concerns a Canadian soldier who is billeted with a British family for the Christmas holidays. It was based on the hit West End play A Soldier for Christmas by Reginald Beckwith. The film was shot at Pinewood Studios with sets designed by the art director George Provis. It was the final film of French director Varnel, known for his many comedies featuring music hall stars including Will Hay and George Formby, who died in a car accident following the shooting of the film.

Premise
The wealthy Ferguson family are planning a quiet Christmas at their home in the countryside of Southern England. A series of disruptions begin with the arrival of the married elder daughter, who has fled her London home after a row with her husband. This is followed successively by Millie a WAAF NAAFI girl who used to be a servant in the house now being billeted there, and then a Canadian soldier Bill from a nearby base who is sent by his Colonel as a punishment for getting into fights with British troops in answer to a goodwill invitation from Mrs Ferguson.

The scatty Mrs Ferguson expected the Colonel himself to arrive himself, but takes Bill's arrival in her stride. An initial fear that the family will have no bird to cook for Christmas dinner is offset when they are deluged by gifts of turkeys from several different directions, ending up with far too many. The younger daughter of the house Phoebe had been previously showing some interest in their lodger Ronnie, a scientist. Suffering doubts about his offer of marriage, she seemingly falls head over heals with the strong, easygoing Canadian who is billeted with them. This provokes rivalry with Millie who also rapidly falls in love with him.

The sardonic Ronnie finds himself pushed aside, and even when he saves Bill's life rescuing some mail stolen by a criminal gang, he allows the Canadian to be hailed as a hero and himself as a coward. Things come to a head after a dance at the Canadian base. Phoebe spends a long time in Bill's room which several other characters, particularly Millie and Mrs Ferguson, draw the worst implications from. In fact they have been taking things over. Before long Phoebe realises she really does love Ronnie. The eldest daughter is then reconciled with her husband who arrives from London with yet another turkey. 

In the postwar era Bill is back in Saskatoon where he and Millie have been happily married for several years.

Cast
 Tom Walls as Philip Ferguson
 Glynis Johns as Millie
 Jeanne de Casalis as Mrs Ferguson
 Hugh McDermott as Bill Mackenzie
 Nova Pilbeam as Phoebe Ferguson
 Barry Morse as Ronnie
 Rosalyn Boulter as Brenda Ferguson
 Ambrosine Phillpotts as Lady Daubney
 Mary Merrall as Mrs Jarvis
 Agnes Lauchlan as Cook
 Bernard Lee as James Nicholls
 Charles Victor as Hijacker
 Bryan Herbert as 	Hijacker
 Peter Gawthorne as Businessman
 Cyril Smith as Taxi driver
 Charles Farrell as	Canadian Sergeant
 Natalie Lynn as 	Mrs. Mackenzie
 Leslie Dwyer as Van Driver

References

Bibliography
 Baskin, Ellen & Enser, A. G. S. Enser's filmed books and plays: 1928-2001. Ashgate Publishing, 2003.

External links

1946 films
1946 comedy films
1940s English-language films
British films based on plays
Films directed by Marcel Varnel
British comedy films
Films set in England
Columbia Pictures films
British black-and-white films
Films produced by Marcel Varnel
1940s British films
Films set in London
Films shot at Pinewood Studios